The 2009 Men's under-19 World Floorball Championships Qualifying rounds took place over September 10–14, 2008 in Kartal, Hungary.

The top 2 teams (Russia & Hungary) advanced to play in the B-Division at the 2009 Men's under-19 World Floorball Championships.

All matches took place at the Zsivóczky Gyula Sporthall.

Results

September 10, 2008

September 11, 2008

September 12, 2008

September 13, 2008

September 14, 2008

See also
2009 Men's under-19 World Floorball Championships
2009 Men's under-19 World Floorball Championships B-Division

External links
Standings & Statistics
Official Website

under-19
2008 in floorball
International sports competitions hosted by Hungary
2008 in Hungarian sport